Joseph Michael Medwick (November 24, 1911 – March 21, 1975), nicknamed "Ducky" and "Muscles", was an American Major League Baseball player. A left fielder with the St. Louis Cardinals during the "Gashouse Gang" era of the 1930s, he also played with the Brooklyn Dodgers (1940–1943, 1946), New York Giants (1943–1945), and Boston Braves (1945). Medwick is the last National League player to win the Triple Crown Award (1937).

A ten-time All-Star, Medwick was elected to the Baseball Hall of Fame by the Baseball Writers' Association of America in 1968 with 84.81% of the votes. In 2014, he became a member of the inaugural class of the St. Louis Cardinals Hall of Fame.

Early life
Medwick was born and raised in Carteret, New Jersey, the son of Hungarian immigrants. He excelled in baseball, basketball, football, and track at Carteret High School. Famed football coach Knute Rockne made arrangements for Medwick to play football at University of Notre Dame, but he chose professional baseball instead.

Career
Medwick entered professional baseball in 1930 with the Scottdale Scotties of the Middle Atlantic League. In 75 games he had a .419 batting average and 22 home runs. He spent most of the next two seasons with the Houston Buffaloes of the Texas League. He played 161 games for Houston in 1931, hitting .305 with 19 home runs. He played in 139 games for the team the next year, hitting .354 with 26 home runs before being called up to the major leagues.

He made his MLB debut with the Cardinals in 1932. By 1934, he hit .319 with 18 home runs and 106 runs batted in (RBIs). Though Medwick swung at any pitch near the strike zone, he was difficult to strike out. He became known as one of baseball's rising stars, but was competitive to the point of combativeness, and regarded by some as self-centered.

Medwick's hard-charging style of play got him pulled out of the seventh game of the 1934 World Series by Commissioner Kenesaw Mountain Landis after a hard slide into third baseman Marv Owen on a triple which caused Detroit Tigers fans to pelt Medwick with fruits and vegetables. Landis also ordered Owen benched. Medwick remains the only known player to be thrown out of a game for his own personal safety. When asked about the incident after the game, Medwick replied, "I knew why they threw them. What I don't understand is why they brought them to the ballpark in the first place."

Medwick won the National League Triple Crown and the NL Most Valuable Player Award in 1937, leading the league with a .374 batting average, 31 home runs, and 154 RBIs. He remains the last NL player to win a Triple Crown. He would have won its home run component outright, but a home run hit in a June 6 game that was later wiped out by forfeit left him tied with Mel Ott. Medwick also led the National League with 237 hits, 111 runs scored, 56 doubles, 406 total bases, and a .641 slugging percentage.

Medwick's 64 doubles in 1936 remains the National League record. He also held the National League record with seven consecutive seasons with 40 or more doubles until Stan Musial topped it with nine. In 1940, the Cardinals traded Medwick and Curt Davis to the Dodgers for $125,000 and four lesser-known players. While still a solid hitter, Medwick never excelled defensively, where the Cardinals felt he was losing some of the skills he displayed in his 1937 Triple Crown season. Team president Branch Rickey and owner Sam Breadon also thought the trade would be best because they thought that Medwick was becoming increasingly discontented with being a Cardinal, having spent all season haggling with the pair over his contract.

Six days after the trade, Medwick was nearly killed by what some at the time regarded as a beanball thrown by former Cardinals teammate Bob Bowman. A mob of Dodgers led by their manager, Leo Durocher, charged the mound and had to be restrained from going after Bowman by the other Cardinals and the umpires. Uniformed members of the New York City Police Department sat with Bowman in the dugout to protect him from the crowd, and on request from Dodger president Larry MacPhail, nearly one hundred were present by the end of the game.

William O'Dwyer, Brooklyn's district attorney, started an investigation to determine whether the hit by pitch was deliberate. Bowman blamed the incident on sign stealing by Dodgers coach Chuck Dressen. He said that Dressen would whistle each time he saw the sign for a curveball. Hearing the whistle, Medwick stepped toward what he thought was a curveball, but Bowman had decided to throw a high, inside fastball to confuse them. When Medwick strode forward, the ball hit him in the temple and rendered him unconscious. Medwick did not blame Bowman for the beaning, telling one of O'Dwyer's aides: "No direct threat had been made to me by Bowman. I saw the ball leave from his hand, but that was the last I saw of it."

NL president Ford Frick conducted his own investigation. Durocher and the Dodgers told him they still thought the hit by pitch was deliberate; Bowman countered that "I never meant to hurt Joe." On June 20, O'Dwyer's office dismissed the case for lack of evidence. The next day, Frick reached the same verdict.

Though contemporary baseball writers wondered if the beaning would affect Medwick's playing, baseball historian Frank Russo does not believe that it did, pointing to Medwick's strong statistics in 1940. In 1941, Medwick helped Brooklyn win their first pennant since 1920. He was traded to the New York Giants in 1943. During a USO tour by a number of players in 1944, Medwick was among several individuals given an audience by Pope Pius XII, who had been Cardinal Secretary of State before his elevation to the papacy. Upon being asked by the Pope what his vocation was, Medwick replied, "Your Holiness, I'm Joe Medwick. I, too, used to be a Cardinal."

Late in his career, Medwick said that golf was helping him to stay in good physical condition; 36 holes per day allowed him to walk more than 10 miles "without heavy strain".

In 1946, he was signed as a free agent by the St. Louis Browns, but coming out of spring training was unable to stick with the team and was seemingly out of baseball at just 34. He eventually returned to St. Louis to finish his career with the Cardinals in 1947 and 1948.  Medwick retired with a .324 batting average, a ten-time All-Star over 17 Big League seasons. 

He stayed in the game, at the minor league level.  In 1949 he was player-coach of the Miami Beach Flamingos, a Class 'B' team in the Florida International League. He had 375 at-bats in 106 games, with 121 hits for a .323 batting average. He continued playing through 1952 with Class 'B' Raleigh and Tampa, but his numbers declined substantially.

Career statistics
In 1984 games played over 17 seasons Medwick compiled a .324 batting average (2471-7635) with 1198 runs, 540 doubles, 113 triples, 205 home runs, 1383 RBI, 437 bases on balls, .362 on-base percentage and .505 slugging percentage. He recorded a career .980 fielding percentage. In 12 World Series games (1934,1941), he hit .326 (15-46) with five runs, five RBI, and one home run.

Later life

In 1966, Medwick was hired as a hitting instructor in the Cardinals minor league system, a role he held until 1975. During spring training that year, on March 21, he died of a heart attack in St. Petersburg, Florida. He was buried at St. Lucas Cemetery in Sunset Hills, Missouri, a suburb of St. Louis.

Legacy
Medwick received no votes for enshrinement in the Baseball Hall of Fame the first seven years after his retirement, which is sometimes attributed to his strained relationship with teammates and the press. He continued to fall short of the required 75% vote threshold on numerous ballots until he was elected by the Baseball Writers' Association of America in his final year of eligibility in 1968. 

After his election, he said, "This was the longest slump of my career. I had gone 0 for 20 before, but never 0 for 20 years."

In January 2014, the Cardinals announced Medwick among 22 former players and personnel to be inducted into the St. Louis Cardinals Hall of Fame Museum for the inaugural class of 2014.

Joseph Medwick Park along the banks of the Rahway River in Woodbridge Township and Carteret in Middlesex County, New Jersey is named in his honor.

See also

 List of Major League Baseball doubles records
 List of Major League Baseball career hits leaders
 List of Major League Baseball career doubles leaders
 List of Major League Baseball career triples leaders
 List of Major League Baseball career runs scored leaders
 List of Major League Baseball career runs batted in leaders
 List of Major League Baseball players to hit for the cycle
 Major League Baseball Triple Crown
 List of Major League Baseball batting champions
 List of Major League Baseball annual home run leaders
 List of Major League Baseball annual runs batted in leaders
 List of Major League Baseball annual runs scored leaders
 List of Major League Baseball annual doubles leaders
 List of Major League Baseball annual triples leaders
 List of St. Louis Cardinals team records

References

Further reading

External links

Joe Medwick Oral History Interview - National Baseball Hall of Fame Digital Collection

National Baseball Hall of Fame inductees
Major League Baseball left fielders
St. Louis Cardinals players
Boston Braves players
Brooklyn Dodgers players
New York Giants (NL) players
National League All-Stars
Baseball players from New Jersey
Carteret High School alumni
People from Carteret, New Jersey
Sportspeople from Middlesex County, New Jersey
American people of Hungarian descent
National League batting champions
National League home run champions
National League RBI champions
National League Triple Crown winners
Minor league baseball managers
1911 births
1975 deaths
Scottdale Scotties players
Houston Buffaloes players
Miami Beach Flamingos players
Raleigh Capitals players
Tampa Smokers players
National League Most Valuable Player Award winners